Uggiate-Trevano is a comune (municipality) in the Province of Como in the Italian region Lombardy, located about  northwest of Milan and about  west of Como, on the border with Switzerland.

Uggiate-Trevano borders the following municipalities: Albiolo, Bizzarone, Colverde, Faloppio, Novazzano (Switzerland), Ronago, Valmorea.

Twin towns — sister cities
Uggiate-Trevano is twinned with:

  Adelsdorf, Bavaria, Germany (1998)
  Ruaudin, France (2013)

References

Cities and towns in Lombardy